Clearwater County is a municipal district in west central Alberta, Canada in Division No. 9. Its northwest boundary is the Brazeau River. The municipal office is located in the Town of Rocky Mountain House. The county has a land area of 18,691.65 km2 (7,216.89 sq mi) and comprises close to 99% of Census Division No. 9's land area of 18,921.38 km2 (7,305.59 sq mi). Although the territory excluded is rather small in geographical area, it comprises the major population centre of Rocky Mountain House, which has one-third of Division No. 9's population, in addition to the communities of Caroline, Burnstick Lake and three Indian reserves. The county's 2016 census population was 11,947.

The economy of the county is based on agriculture, oil and gas and forestry, with tourism increasing in importance in recent years.

On July 1, 2000, the name was changed from "Municipal District of Clearwater No. 99" to "Clearwater County".

Geography

Communities and localities 
The following urban municipalities are surrounded by Clearwater County.
Cities
none
Towns
Rocky Mountain House
Villages
Caroline
Summer villages
Burnstick Lake

The following hamlets are located within Clearwater County.
Hamlets
Alhambra
Condor
Leslieville
Nordegg
Withrow

The following localities are located within Clearwater County.
Localities

Alexo
Ancona
Baptiste River
Bingley
Brazeau
Brower Subdivision
Butte
Carlos
Chedderville
Clearwater Subdivision
Cline River
Cline Settlement
Codner
Congresbury

Crammond
Crimson Lake
Dovercourt
Evergreen
Ferrier (designated place)
Ferrier Acres Trailer Court
Garth
Goldeye
Gray Subdivision
Harlech
Horburg
Improvement District No. 10
James River Bridge
Lochearn

Martins Trailer Court (designated place)
Morrish Subdivision
Oras
Pinewoods Estates
Ricinus
Saunders
Stauffer
Stolberg
Strachan
Ullin
Vetchland
Westerner Trailer Court
Woodland Estates
Ya Ha Tinda Ranch

Other places
Phoenix, a former coal mining community between Nordegg and Rocky Mountain House, is also located within Clearwater County.

Demographics 

In the 2016 Census of Population conducted by Statistics Canada, Clearwater County had a population of 11,947 living in 4,699 of its 5,486 total private dwellings, a  change from its 2011 population of 12,278.

Attractions 
 Rocky Mountain House Historic Site in Rocky Mountain House
 Historic minesite in Nordegg
 Hiking in the Bighorn Wildland
 Camping at Burnstick Lake campsite
 Canoeing on lakes; Rafting and kayaking on Clearwater River and North Saskatchewan River
 Cross-country skiing, snowmobile trail in the Chambers Creek area
 Fishing (cutthroat, rainbow, brook and lake trout, whitefish) and hunting

See also 
List of communities in Alberta
List of municipal districts in Alberta
Division No. 9, Alberta

References

External links 

 
Municipal districts in Alberta